Dorcadion uhagonii is a species of beetle in the family Cerambycidae. It was described by Perez-Arcas in 1868. It is known from Spain.

See also 
Dorcadion

Subspecies
 Dorcadion uhagonii pradae (Del Saz Fucho, 2007)
 Dorcadion uhagonii uhagonii Perez-Arcas, 1868

References

uhagonii
Beetles described in 1868